The Klassik Stiftung Weimar (Classical Foundation Weimar) is one of the largest and most significant cultural institutions in Germany. It owns more than 20 museums, palaces, historic houses and parks, as well as literary and art collections, a number of which are World Heritage Sites.

It focuses on the Weimar Classicism period, but also covers 19th and 20th century art and culture with properties associated with Franz Liszt, Friedrich Nietzsche, Henry van de Velde and the Bauhaus.

Eleven of its properties are listed as part of the Classical Weimar World Heritage Site and the Haus am Horn is part of the Bauhaus and its Sites in Weimar, Dessau and Bernau World Heritage Site.

The foundation was created on 1 January 2003 through the merger of the Stiftung Weimarer Klassik and the Kunstsammlungen zu Weimar. It was known from 2003 to 2006 as the Stiftung Weimarer Klassik und Kunstsammlungen.

The Klassik Stiftung Weimar is a member of the Konferenz Nationaler Kultureinrichtungen, a union of more than twenty cultural institutions in the five new states of Germany which were formerly part of the German Democratic Republic.

Weimarer Fürstengruft and Historical Cemetery
The Weimarer Fürstengruft is the ducal burial chapel of Saxe-Weimar-Eisenach and is located in the Historical Cemetery (Historischer Friedhof Weimar). It houses the tombs of Goethe and Schiller. It is part of the Klassik Stiftung Weimar and since 1998 it and the cemetery have been part of the Classical Weimar World Heritage Site.

Gallery

References

External links
 Klassik Stiftung Weimar
 UNESCO.Classical Weimar
 UNESCO. Bauhaus and its sites in Weimar, Dessau and Bernau
 Ducal Vault – official site

2003 establishments in Germany
Furstengruft
Cemeteries in Weimar
Furstengruft
Culture in Weimar
Cultural organisations based in Germany
Education in Weimar
Friedrich Schiller
History of Weimar
Johann Wolfgang von Goethe
Organizations established in 2003
Protected areas of Thuringia